The Court of Last Resort  is an American television dramatized court show which aired October 4, 1957 – April 11, 1958, on NBC. It was co-produced by Erle Stanley Gardner's Paisano Productions, which also brought forth the long-running hit CBS-TV law series, Perry Mason.

Summary
The concept for The Court of Last Resort was developed from a popular true crime column of the same name. Written by lawyer-turned-author Erle Stanley Gardner, the column appeared in the monthly magazine Argosy for ten years beginning in September 1948. Gardner enlisted assistance from police, private detectives, and other professional experts to examine the cases of dozens of convicts who maintained their innocence long after their appeals were exhausted.

The TV show centers on seven attorneys who take on the cases of wrongly accused or unjustly convicted defendants. Episodes dramatized various cases investigated by the Court from its inception through "the present". The members of the Court were portrayed by actors during the episode, but the actual members often appeared at the conclusion of the program, with one of them reflecting on the case that had just been dramatized.

The series aired October 4, 1957 – April 11, 1958, on NBC at 8 p.m. EST on Fridays. It was rebroadcast on ABC on Wednesdays from August 1959 to February 17, 1960.

The program was sponsored by the P. Lorillard Company, a cigarette manufacturer.

Principal cast

 Robert H. Harris as Raymond Schindler
 Carleton Young as Harry Steeger 
 S. John Launer as Marshall Houts 
 John Maxwell as Alex Gregory
 Robert J. Anderson as Park Street Jr. 
 Lyle Bettger as Sam Larsen
 Paul Birch as Erle Stanley Gardner
 Charles Meredith as Dr. LeMoyne Snyder

Episode list

Legacy
The Court of Last Resort'''s extra-judicial approach to dealing with potential miscarriages of justice was adopted by the BBC series Rough Justice'' in the 1980s.

References

External links 
 
 The Court of Last Resort at Justice Denied

1957 American television series debuts
1958 American television series endings
1950s American drama television series
Black-and-white American television shows
1950s American crime television series
English-language television shows
Dramatized court shows
NBC original programming
Erle Stanley Gardner